Kyren (Kheren; , Khereen) is a rural locality (a selo) and the administrative center of Tunkinsky District of the Republic of Buryatia, Russia. Population:

References

Notes

Sources

Rural localities in Tunkinsky District